, known professionally as  and , is a Japanese actress. She is known for her role as Mio (ToQ 3gou) in the 2014 Super Sentai series Ressha Sentai ToQger.

Career
She was affiliated with Kirin Pro and started her career in 2001. In 2007, she moved to LesPros Entertainment. In 2008, she changed her name to "Riria". In 2011, she won the Playboy Grand Prix prize at the third Gravure Japan awards. In 2014, she appeared in two tokusatsu series; Ressha Sentai ToQger and Zero: Black Blood. On June 17, 2015, she changed her name to "Riria Kojima". In December 2020, she left LesPros Entertainment. In 2021, she joined Toyota Office.

Filmography

Films
Sabi Otoko Sabi Onna – "Boy? meets girl." (2011)
Zyuden Sentai Kyoryuger vs. Go-Busters: The Great Dinosaur Battle! Farewell Our Eternal Friends (2014) – ToQ 3gou (voice)
Zero: Black Blood (2014) – Yuna
Heisei Rider vs. Shōwa Rider: Kamen Rider Taisen feat. Super Sentai (2014) – Mio
Ressha Sentai ToQger the Movie: Galaxy Line S.O.S. (2014) – Mio
Ressha Sentai ToQger vs. Kyoryuger: The Movie (2015) – Mio
Senpai to Kanojo (2015) – Aoi Okita
Shuriken Sentai Ninninger vs. ToQger the Movie: Ninja in Wonderland (2016) - Mio
Wolf Girl and Black Prince (2016) - Namie Yūki
The Werewolf Game: Prison Break (2016) - Akari Inui
Ankoku Joshi (2017) - Akane Kominami
Aru Machi no Takai Entotsu (2019) - Chiho Kaya
Okaeri, Kāko (2019) - Shiori Tonomura

TV dramas
Kinyō Entertainment: True Stories – Uso o Tsuita Otoko (Fuji TV, 2002)
Getsuyō Mystery Gekijō: Nishimura Kyōtarō Suspense – Tantei Samonji Susumu 9 "16-nenme no Hōmonsha" (TBS, 2004) - Keiko Arimori (young)
Kayō Suspense Gekijō: Keishichō Kanshikihan 17 (NTV, 2004) – Keiko Nanjō (young)
Medaka episode 1 (Fuji TV, 2004) – Tae Kawashima (young)
Division 1: Stage 15 – Odaiba Bōken Ō SP Kareshi Sensei!! last episode (Fuji TV, 2005)
Kamen Rider Kabuto episode 20 (TV Asahi, 2006) – Hiroko
Sensei wa Erai! (NTV, 2008) – 2-B student
Bloody Monday (TBS, 2008)
Koishite Akuma ~Vampire Boy~ (KTV, 2009) – Yuri Meguro
Tensou Sentai Goseiger episode 20 (TV Asahi, 2010) – Mizuki Takasaki
Shin Keishichō Sōsaikka 9-gakari Season 2 episode 11 (TV Asahi, 2010) – High school girl
Ohisama episode 7 (NHK, 2011)
Akko to Bokura ga Ikita Natsu (NHK General TV, 2012) – Natsumi Hara
Idol Toshi Densetsu – Akai Heya (Pigoo HD, 2012) – Mana Sakurada
Sansū Keiji Zero episode 10 (NHK Educational TV, 2013)
Ressha Sentai ToQger (TV Asahi, 2014) – Mio
Ressha Sentai ToQger vs. Kamen Rider Gaim: Spring Break Combined Special (TV Asahi, 2014) – Mio
Omotesandō Kōkō Gasshōbu! (TBS, 2015) – Fūka Takeuchi
Seishun Tantei Haruya ~Otona no Aku o Yurusanai!~ episode 2 (YTV, 2015) – Chiaki Hironuma
Kozure Shinbee (NHK BS Premium, 2015) - Obun
Rinshō Hanzai Gakusha Himura Hideo no Suiri episode 5 (NTV, 2016) - Yura
Kozure Shinbee 2 (NHK BS Premium, 2016) - Obun
Garo: Makai Retsuden episode 5 (TV Tokyo, 2016) – Yuna
Asa ga Kuru (Fuji TV, 2016) - Akane Katakura
The Last Cop episode 5 (NTV, 2016) - Mika Takiguchi
3-nin no Papa episodes 7-10 (TBS, 2017) - Asami Tsuboi
Mito Kōmon episode 2 (BS-TBS, 2017) - Aya
Keishichō Zero-gakari ~Seikatsu Anzenbu Nandemo Sōdanshitsu~ Season 4 episode 6 (TV Tokyo, 2019) - Misaki Majima
Tensai Terebi-kun You Special "Real Sensō Game" (NHK Educational TV, 2019) - Riko Kojima

Web dramas
Oyaji no Shigoto wa Ura Kagyō (BeeTV, 2012) – Chika Matsuda
All Esper Dayo! ~Yokubō Darake no Love Wars~ (dTV, 2015) – Asuka Hoshino
Otona Kōkō Spin-Off ~Enjō no Cherry Christmas~ (AbemaTV, 2017) - Ayano Tsubaki
Watashi ga Kemono ni Natta Yoru (AbemaTV, 2021) - Aoi

Music videos
Funky Monkey Babys – Ato Hitotsu (2010)
Dohzi-T – LOVE TRAP feat. Thelma Aoyama (2011)
Crystal Kay - Sakura (2016)
Leo - Kimi (2016)
Doberman Infinity - Zutto (2019)
Rhythmic Toy World - Saijitsu (2020)

Publications

DVD releases
Riria to Date (2005)
I AM RiRia (2012)
Hatachi. (2014)
Ressha Sentai ToQger Returns: Super ToQ 7gou of Dreams (2015) – Mio

CD releases
Ressha Sentai ToQger Character Songs: Rainbow Line (2014) - "Yellow heart"
Ressha Sentai ToQger Zenkyokushū: Rainbow Rush (2014) - "Yellow heart"

Photobooks
Lily White (2005)
Hantōmei (2019)

References

External links
Official profile at Toyota Office 

1993 births
Actresses from Tokyo
Japanese child actresses
Japanese film actresses
Japanese stage actresses
Japanese television actresses
Japanese gravure models
Japanese female models
Living people
21st-century Japanese actresses